2021 in film is an overview of events, including award ceremonies, film festivals, a list of country-specific lists of films released, and movie programming.

Evaluation of the year
In his article highlighting the best movies of 2021, Richard Brody of The New Yorker said, "From an artistic perspective, 2021 has been an excellent cinematic vintage, yet the bounty is shadowed by an air of doom. The reopening of theatres has brought many great movies—some of which were postponed from last year—to the big screen, but fewer people to see them. The biggest successes, as usual, have been superhero and franchise films. The French Dispatch has done respectably in wide release, and Licorice Pizza is doing superbly on four screens in New York and Los Angeles, but few, if any, of the year’s best films are likely to reach high on the box-office charts. The shift toward streaming was already under way when the pandemic struck, and as the trend has accelerated it’s had a paradoxical effect on movies. On the one hand, a streaming release is a wide release, happily accessible to all (or to all subscribers). On the other, an online release usually registers as a nonevent, and many of the great movies hardly make a blip on the mediascape despite being more accessible than ever."

Highest-grossing films

2021 box office records
 Worldwide, the global box office ended the year at $21.4 billion, a figure 78% higher than 2020.
 China was the highest-grossing country of 2021 with $7.3 billion.
 In the United States and Canada, theaters earned an estimated $4.55 billion throughout 2021, a statistic 100% higher than 2020's $2.28 billion and 60% lower than 2019's $11.4 billion.

Film records
 The Marvel Cinematic Universe became the first film franchise to gross $23 billion, $24 billion, and $25 billion with the releases of Black Widow, Shang-Chi and the Legend of the Ten Rings, Eternals, and Spider-Man: No Way Home. Additionally, the MCU became the first film franchise to have ten films gross over $1 billion with the release of Spider-Man: No Way Home.
 Spider-Man: No Way Home became the 48th film to gross $1 billion worldwide (the first film to do so since 2019's Star Wars: The Rise of Skywalker prior to the COVID-19 pandemic), surpassed Spider-Man: Far From Home as Sony's highest-grossing film of all time, and held the distinction of being the highest-grossing film not to be released in China (one of the world's biggest box office markets).
 Also, is the third film to surpass the $800 million mark in North America.
 In Latin America, No Way Home became the all-time highest-grossing film in Mexico, and the second all-time highest in Brazil, Central America and Ecuador.
 The Battle at Lake Changjin became the highest-grossing non-English film of all time as well as highest-grossing Chinese film of all time.
 The Battle at Lake Changjin also became the second highest-grossing film in a single market, after Star Wars: The Force Awakens (2015) in the United States.
 Hi, Mom became the highest-grossing film by a solo female director, surpassing the record set by Wonder Woman (2017).
 Detective Chinatown 3 set the record for the biggest opening weekend in a single territory, surpassing the record set by Avengers: Endgame in 2019, and had the tenth highest-grossing opening weekend on release.
 Avatar became the highest-grossing film of all time again after a re-release in China increased its gross past $2.8 billion.
 The anime film Demon Slayer: Mugen Train (2020) released in North America in April 2021, with its opening weekend gross of  setting the record as the biggest opening for any foreign-language film released in North America.

Events

Award ceremonies

Film festivals
List of some of the film festivals for 2021 that have been accredited by the International Federation of Film Producers Associations (FIAPF).

Awards

2021 films

By country/region 
 List of American films of 2021
 List of Australian films of 2021
 List of Bangladeshi films of 2021
 List of British films of 2021
 List of Canadian films of 2021
List of Chinese films of 2021
 List of French films of 2021
 List of Hong Kong films of 2021
 List of Indian films of 2021
 List of Japanese films of 2021
 List of Nigerian films of 2021
 List of Philippine films of 2021
 List of Russian films of 2021
 List of South Korean films of 2021
 List of Spanish films of 2021
 List of Sri Lankan films of 2021

By genre/medium
 List of animated feature films of 2021
 List of horror films of 2021
 List of science fiction films of 2021

Deaths

Notes

References 

 
Film by year